The Avatiu Stream is the largest watercourse on Rarotonga. It rises in the central mountains beneath Te Rua Manga and flows north to the sea at Avatiu.

In 2018 a heavy downpour caused the stream to overflow its banks and flood businesses in Avatiu. In July 2020 the stream dried up due to low rainfall.

References

Rivers of the Cook Islands
Rarotonga